Keith Albert Aldridge (born July 20, 1973) is an American former professional ice hockey defenseman.  He played four games in the National Hockey League with the Dallas Stars in the 1999–2000 season.

Playing career

Amateur
As a youth, Aldridge played in the 1985, 1986 and 1987 Quebec International Pee-Wee Hockey Tournaments with the Detroit Compuware and Detroit Red Wings minor ice hockey teams.

Aldridge played junior hockey with the Rochester Mustangs of the United States Hockey League in 1991-92, where he was named to the USHL First All-Star Team.

Aldridge played college hockey for Lake Superior State University of the Central Collegiate Hockey Association, and was voted the CCHA Best Offensive Defenseman in 1995-96.  He was a member of the Lakers' NCAA National Championship team in 1993-94, and was also named to the All-Star Tournament First Team.  Aldridge was also named Second Team CCHA in 1994, First Team CCHA in 1995 and 1996, NCAA West Second All-American Team in 1995, and NCAA West First All-American Team in 1996.

Aldridge was a finalist for the 1996 Hobey Baker Award that went to Brian Bonin of Minnesota.

Professional
Aldridge was not selected in the NHL Entry Draft out of college, but signed as an undrafted free agent with the Baltimore Bandits of the American Hockey League in 1996.

In 1997, Aldridge signed with his hometown Detroit Vipers of the International Hockey League, where he was named an IHL All-Star in 1998-99.  His impressive play led to a professional contract with the Dallas Stars of the National Hockey League in 1999.  Although most of his season was spent in the IHL with the affiliate Kalamazoo Wings, he did play 4 games with the Stars. He spent the 2000-01 season with the Grand Rapids Griffins of the IHL. From 2001-2004, Aldridge played overseas for the Frankfurt Lions and Eisbären Berlin.

Aldridge signed with the New York Islanders in 2004, a move that reunited him with his college head coach Jeff Jackson, who had recently joined the Islanders staff as an assistant coach.  Aldridge could not crack the NHL lineup, and he concluded his playing career in the AHL with the Bridgeport Sound Tigers in 2005.

Post playing career
Aldridge currently serves as vice president and general manager of Indianwood Golf and Country Club in Lake Orion, Michigan.  His father, Stan Aldridge, had purchased the club in 1981.  Aldridge worked at the facility through his youth before joining the organization full-time.

Career statistics

Regular season and playoffs

International

Awards and honours

References

External links

1973 births
American men's ice hockey defensemen
Baltimore Bandits players
Bridgeport Sound Tigers players
Dallas Stars players
Detroit Vipers players
Eisbären Berlin players
Frankfurt Lions players
Grand Rapids Griffins (IHL) players
Ice hockey people from Detroit
Kalamazoo Wings (1974–2000) players
Lake Superior State Lakers men's ice hockey players
Living people
People from Bloomfield Hills, Michigan
Rochester Mustangs players
Undrafted National Hockey League players
NCAA men's ice hockey national champions
AHCA Division I men's ice hockey All-Americans